

Medalists

Qualification

Qualification rule: qualification standard 18.45m or at least best 8 qualified

Final

Shot put at the World Athletics Indoor Championships
Shot Put Women
2008 in women's athletics